

The Osirion or Osireion is an ancient megalithic structure located at Abydos, to the rear of the Temple of Seti I. Its original purpose is unknown.

It is an integral part of Seti I's funeral complex and is possibly built to resemble an 18th Dynasty Valley of the Kings tomb. The site contains a stone-paved island in the centre, chambers in both wings and, around the island, a water basin of yet undetermined but no less than 10.4m depth which was probably used as a well. Access was via a 69m stone lined passage. In the whole of Egypt, there is no architectural equivalent to the Osireion with its massive blocks, numerous trilithons, extraordinarily narrow and regular joints as well as a lack of round pillars except for the Valley Temple in Giza.

The Osireion was discovered by archaeologists Flinders Petrie and Margaret Murray, who were excavating the site in 1902–03. The Osirion was originally built at a considerably lower level than the foundations of the temple of Seti, who ruled from 1294 to 1279 BC. While, with regard to the depth of the building, its untypical architectural style and its mythological context, there is disagreement as to its true age, in his 1998 dissertation on Seti I, Peter J. Brand, mainly emphasising on the numerous cartouches of Seti I found inscribed at the site, says it "can be dated confidently to Seti's reign".

Strabo visited the Osireion in the first century BC and gave a description of the site as it appeared in his time:

The subterranean water basin at the Osireion was consequently named "Strabo's Well" by modern excavators.

Strabo then theorises that the Osireion might have been constructed by Ismandes, or Mandes (Amenemhet III, 12th dynasty, who reigned in the 19th and 18th centuries BC), the same purported builder as with the Labyrinth at Hawara:

Strabo's uncertainty about the origins of the structure highly suggests that these were already unknown by the time of his visit.

See also
List of megalithic sites

References

External links

 The Osirion The original notes by archeologist Sir William Flinders-Petrie on the discovery of the Osirion site, published in 1903.

Bibliography 
 Frankfort, H., De Buck, A. & Gunn, B. The Cenotaph of Seti I at Abydos, 2 vol. Memoir of the Egypt Exploration Society, Egypt Exploration Society. London, 1933.
 Hamilton, Keith. The Osireion: A Layman's Guide, 2018, Web, https://www.researchgate.net/publication/328225133_The_Osireion_A_Layman%27s_Guide.
Hornung, Erik, trans. from German by David Lorton. The Ancient Egyptian Books of the Afterlife. Cornell University Press, Ithaca, New York, 1999.
 Murray, Margaret A. The Osirion at Abydos, British School of Egyptian Archeology n°1, London, 1904.
O'Connor, David. Abydos: Egypt's First Pharaohs and the Cult of Osiris, Thames & Hudson, London, 2009 and 2011.
 Petrie, Flinders. The Osirion at Abydos
Pinch, Geraldine. Egyptian Mythology: A Guide to the Gods, Goddesses, and Traditions of Ancient Egypt. Oxford University Press, 2002.
 Naville, Edouard. "Abydos". The Journal of Egyptian Archaeology, vol. 1, no. 1, 1914, pp. 2–8. JSTOR, www.jstor.org/stable/3853664.
 Murray, Margaret Alice., J. G. Milne, and W. E. Crum. The Osireion at Abydos. London: Histories & Mysteries of Man, 1989. Print.

Seti I
Abydos, Egypt sites